Senator McMahon may refer to:

Brien McMahon (1903–1952), U.S. Senator from Connecticut from 1945 to 1952
Larry McMahon (1929–2006), Senate of Ireland
Martin T. McMahon (1838–1906), New York State Senate
Sam McMahon (born 1967), Australian Senator for the Northern Territory since 2019

See also
Chad McMahan (fl. 1990s–2010s), Mississippi State Senate